Admiral Burke may refer to:

Arleigh Burke (1901–1996), U.S. Navy admiral
Edward Burke (American football) (1907–1967), U.S. Navy rear admiral
Robert P. Burke (born 1962), U.S. Navy admiral